Yabbra is a national park in New South Wales, Australia, 598 km north of Sydney.

The average elevation of the terrain is 387 meters.

See also
 Protected areas of New South Wales

References

External links
Yabbra National Park at www.environment.nsw.gov.au

National parks of New South Wales
Protected areas established in 1999
1999 establishments in Australia